Bertel Strömmer (11 July 1890, Ikaalinen – 18 April 1962, Tampere) was a Finnish architect. Strömmer worked as Tampere City Architect years 1918–53 and most of his work is located in Tampere. Strömmer designed both private and public buildings. Strömmer's most famous works include the Grand Hotel Tammer, the Tampere bus station and the town hall in Kemi.

Bertel Strömmer was the son of a pharmacist Sven Evert Strömmer and his wife Elin Ida Fredrika Fabritius. He graduated in 1908 and graduated as an architect in 1913. In 1914 married Ros-Mari Nordenswan with whom he had eight children.

Works

Grand Hotel Tammer, Tammerfors 1928
Pori Water Tower, 1935
Tampere bus station, 1938
Tempohuset, Tammerfors, 1938
City Hall in Kemi, 1940
Merikoski Power Plant in Oulu, 1941–47
Huberska house, Tampere, 1947–48

References
This article is based on the equivalent article from the Swedish Wikipedia, consulted 5 February 2017.

External links
 Bertel Strömmer at Museum of Finnish Architecture website (in Finnish)

Finnish architects
1890 births
1962 deaths
People from Tampere